Buijs is a Dutch surname. People with the surname Buijs include:

 Anne Buijs (born 1991), Dutch volleyball player
 Danny Buijs (born 1982), Dutch footballer
 Jan Buijs (1889–1961), Dutch architect
 Jordy Buijs (born 1988), Dutch footballer

As part of a compound surname
 Wobine Buijs-Glaudemans (born 1960), Dutch politician

See also
 Buys

Dutch-language surnames